Jefferson Township is one of fourteen townships in Bremer County, Iowa, USA.  At the 2010 census, its population was 3,148.

Geography
According to the United States Geological Survey, it contains two cemeteries: Fairview and Jefferson.

References

External links
 US-Counties.com
 City-Data.com

Townships in Bremer County, Iowa
Waterloo – Cedar Falls metropolitan area
Townships in Iowa